William Price was a Welsh politician who sat in the House of Commons  between 1614 and 1626.

Price was the eldest son  of Lleisan Price of Briton Ferry,  who had been MP for Cardiff,  and his wife Maud Evans daughter  of D Evans of Gnoll. In 1614, he was elected Member of Parliament for Old Sarum. He was elected MP for Glamorgan in 1621 and was elected MP for Cardiff  in 1624, 1625 and 1626. He was under sheriff of Glamorgan in 1626.

Price married  Catherine Thomas daughter of David Popkin Thomas of Ynis Forgan.

References

 
 

Year of birth missing
Year of death missing
Members of the Parliament of England (pre-1707) for constituencies in Wales
17th-century Welsh politicians
People from Briton Ferry
English MPs 1614
English MPs 1621–1622
English MPs 1624–1625
English MPs 1625
English MPs 1626